W. Lafontaine (10 July 1796 in Moscow – 1859 in the 10th arrondissement of Paris) was a 19th-century French playwright.

Biography 
This was probably the pseudonym of Jean Baptiste Joseph Lafontaine who made himself called "Wanincka" (short for Jean in Russian).

Born in Russia, he returned to France in 1802 or 1803 with his father and two brothers. He served in the Imperial Guard from 1812 to 1815 and then as a rifleman until 1817.

After he returned to civilian life, he lived in Paris at 9 Rue du Helder when he married Antoinette Marie Laurentine Almaïde Arnoult de Sartrouville on 18 November 1820. On the marriage certificate, his profession is "man of letters". He then made himself called Wanincka de La Fontaine: he is thus designated on the death certificate of his wife Antoinette, and again on the marriage certificate of his brother Joseph-Pierre at Chamboeuf in 1820 as well as in the birth certificate of his first son Joseph Paul in 1821.

He later became commissaire de police in Paris and lived at 7 rue des Carmelites. Whereas he thought he was exempted to apply for naturalization (since he was married to a French woman and father of five children born in France, and having lived thirty years in France), he must apply to be naturalized French on 28 December 1835 because, at the time, if born abroad, even from French parents, people had to be naturalized to have French nationality and be employed at the service of the State.

His plays were given on the most important Parisian stages of the 19th century, including the Théâtre des Variétés, Théâtre de la Gaîté, and the Théâtre du Vaudeville.

He is buried in Neuilly sur Seine.

Works 

1819: Le Mariage à la husarde, ou Une nuit de printemps, comedy in 1 act and in prose, mingled with vaudevilles, with Armand d'Artois and Emmanuel Théaulon
1819: M. Furet, ou l'Homme aux secrets, comedy in 1 act and in prose, mingled with couplets, with Nicolas Brazier, Pierre Carmouche and Armand-François Jouslin de La Salle
1819: Les Plaideurs de Racine, comédie-anecdote in 1 act and in prose, with Brazier
1821: L'Auberge du grand Frédéric, comédie en vaudeville in 1 act, with Théaulon
1821: Les Voleurs supposés, comédie en vaudeville in 1 act, with Mélesville and Gabriel-Alexandre Belle
1822: La Chercheuse d'esprit, comédie en vaudeville by Favart, given to theatre with changes, with Théophile Marion Dumersan
1823: Les Dames Martin, ou le Mari, la femme et la veuve, comédie en vaudeville in 1 act, with Henri de Tully
1823: Les Femmes et le secret, one-act comedy, mingled with couplets, with Gaspard Touret
1823: Mon ami Christophe, one-act comédie en vaudeville, with Charles Dupeuty and Ferdinand de Villeneuve
1823: Trilby, ou le Lutin du foyer, one-act comedy, mingled with couplets, with Théaulon and Jouslin de La Salle
1824: La Jeunesse d'un grand peintre, ou les Artistes à Rome, comedy in 1 act and in prose, mingled with couplets, with Jules Vernet
1825: Le Docteur du défunt, one-act comédie en vaudeville, with Pierre Carmouche and Léon Laya
1825: La Dot et la fille, ou le Commis marchand, one-act comedy, mingled with couplet, with Louis Gabriel Montigny
1825: Le Marchand de parapluies, ou la Noce à la guinguette, comédie grivoise in 1 act, mingled with couplets, with Marc-Antoine Désaugiers
1827: Les Compagnons du devoir, ou le Tour de France, one-act tableau-vaudeville, with Étienne Crétu and Louis-Émile Vanderburch
1827: Joseph II ou l'inconnu au cabaret, comédie en vaudeville, with Félix-Auguste Duvert and Alexandre-Joseph Le Roy de Bacre
1828: M. Rossignol, ou le Prétendu de province, one-act folie-vaudeville, with Duvert and de Tully
1829: Mon oncle le bossu, ou les Deux pupilles, one-act comedy, in prose, with Mélesville and Eugène de Gaville

Bibliography 
 Henry Lyonnet, Dictionnaire des comédiens français, 1911, (p. 408)
 Joseph-Marie Quérard, Lafontaine W., in La France littéraire ou dictionnaire bibliographique des savants..., 1930, (p. 418)

19th-century French dramatists and playwrights
Writers from Paris
1796 births
1859 deaths